Lists of swords:
List of historical swords
List of Japanese swords
List of National Treasures of Japan (crafts: swords)
List of Wazamono
List of mythological swords
List of fictional swords
List of types of swords
 Classification of swords